The 2022 United States Senate election in Oregon was held on November 8, 2022, to elect a member of the United States Senate to represent the state of Oregon.

Incumbent Democratic U.S. Senator Ron Wyden, who was first elected in a 1996 special election, ran for a fifth full term. Jo Rae Perkins, who unsuccessfully ran for Oregon's other Senate seat in 2020, won the Republican primary with 33.3% of the vote. The four candidates filing with the Oregon Secretary of State for this election included Chris Henry of the Oregon Progressive Party and Dan Pulju of the Pacific Green Party. Wyden ultimately won the election with 55.8% of the statewide vote. This is the first victory of Wyden’s since 1996 where none of the following counties went Democratic in a Senate Class III election: Gilliam, Jackson, Marion, Polk, Wasco and Yamhill. It’s also the first time Columbia County supported the Republican nominee over Wyden.

Democratic primary

Candidates

Nominee 
Ron Wyden, incumbent U.S. Senator (1996–present)

Eliminated in primary 
 Will Barlow, former Electrical and Elevator Board member
Brent Thompson

Endorsements

Results

Republican primary

Candidates

Nominee 
 Jo Rae Perkins, former chair of the Linn County Republican Party

Eliminated in primary 
 Jason Beebe, mayor of Prineville
 Christopher C. Christensen
 Robert M. Fleming
 Darin Harbick, business owner
 Sam Palmer, Grant County commissioner
 Ibra A. Taher, philosopher, peace activist and Pacific Green nominee for U.S. Senate in 2020

Declined

Endorsements

Results

Libertarian primary 
The Libertarian primary was held on June 17th, 2022, a month after the major party primaries.

Candidates

Nominee 
 John R Newton, brewer

Eliminated in primary 
 Will Hobson of Hood River, state leader of the Mises Caucus

Independents

Candidates

Declared 
 Thomas Verde, contract specialist

Pacific Green Party

Candidates

Nominee 
 Dan Pulju

General election

Predictions

Endorsements

Polling

Results 

Counties that flipped from Democratic to Republican
Columbia (largest municipality: St. Helens)
Gilliam (largest municipality: Condon)
Jackson (largest municipality: Medford)
Jefferson (largest municipality: Madras)
Marion (largest municipality: Salem)
Polk (largest municipality: West Salem)
Wasco (largest municipality: The Dalles)
Yamhill (largest municipality: McMinnville)

See also 
 2022 United States Senate elections
 2022 Oregon state elections

Notes

References

External links 
Official campaign websites
 John Newton (L) for Senate
 Jo Rae Perkins (R) for Senate
 Ron Wyden (D) for Senate
 Dan Pulju (PGP) for Senate

2022
Oregon
United States Senate